(Italian for "Daily Crazy") is an Italian satirical online magazine published in Rome. Its complete title is "" ("Daily Crazy, the craziest daily in Italy").

History and profile
Founded in 2007, Daily Crazy has currently between 72 000, and, 80 000 visitors per day, with pages about current political, economic or social affairs, always in an irreverent tone.

See also
 List of magazines in Italy

External links
About Daily Magazine
Daily Magazine Legal Advice

2007 establishments in Italy
Comics magazines published in Italy
Italian-language magazines
Satirical magazines published in Italy
Italian entertainment websites
Magazines about comics
Magazines established in 2007
Magazines published in Rome